Massiccio del Sirino is a massif of Basilicata, southern Italy. The highest peak is Monte Papa, at 2,005 m. It is located in the southern tip of the Appennino Lucano - Val d'Agri - Lagonegrese National Park.

Mountains of Basilicata